Lost Whispers is a compilation album by American rock band Evanescence. It was released on December 9, 2016 on digital music platforms, and included in the six-LP vinyl box set The Ultimate Collection released on February 17, 2017, by The Bicycle Music Company. The album is a collection of B-sides, outtakes, bonus tracks, and two new recordings: "Lost Whispers", a 2009 tour intro, and a re-recording of "Even in Death", originally on their 2000 demo album, Origin.

Background
After the world tour for their 2011 self-titled third studio album, Evanescence took a hiatus from November 2012 to April 2015, during which the members pursued their own projects. During that period, Evanescence also parted ways with their long-term record label Wind-up Records. Amy Lee stated that she was working on solo projects, and there were no current plans for new Evanescence music yet, but the band would continue to tour. In February 2016, Lee said the band was working on a vinyl box set.

Release
On October 11, 2016, the band announced the six-LP vinyl box set The Ultimate Collection. It includes all three Evanescence studio albums—Fallen (2003), The Open Door (2006), and Evanescence (2011)—the previously-unreleased 2000 demo CD Origin, the compilation album Lost Whispers, a studio version of the tour intro "Lost Whispers", a studio recording of the song "Even In Death", as well as a 52-page casebound book with art, handwritten lyrics, photos and rarities. On December 9, 2016, Lost Whispers was independently made available for streaming and download on several music platforms, including the iTunes Store, Spotify and Anghami. It includes a recording of the intro "Lost Whispers", originally performed in a 2009 concert; the re-recorded and reworked "Even in Death"; the song "Missing" from their first live album Anywhere but Home (2004); and B-sides, outtakes, and bonus tracks from all three of their studio albums. The six-LP box set was released on February 17, 2017, by The Bicycle Music Company.

Speaking about the re-recorded version of "Even in Death", Lee said: "It really felt like redemption, like that song was truly redeemed because the early recording we have is not an enjoyable recording, but I really love that song. It was a beautiful experience to be able to take that and live in it now and give it the treatment I would give to any one of our songs with the ability I have now. Now I'm in love with that song again." The recording of "Even in Death" was uploaded on the band's official YouTube account on February 16, 2017.

Craft Recordings released a stand-alone re-issue of Lost Whispers on blue translucent vinyl for Record Store Day on April 21, 2018, limited to 2,500 copies.

Track listing

Release history

Personnel 
Credits adapted from the liner notes of Lost Whispers.

 Amy Lee – performer , production , mixing , engineering 
 Dave Eggar – performer 
 Dave Fortman – production 
 Nick Raskulinecz – production 
 Derik Lee – engineering 
 Ryan Dorn – mastering

Notes

References

2016 compilation albums
Alternative metal compilation albums
B-side compilation albums
Evanescence albums